The Central District of Abdanan County is a district (bakhsh) in Abdanan County, Ilam Province, Iran. At the 2006 census, its population was 28,916, in 6,043 families.  The District has one city: Abdanan. The District has two rural districts (dehestan): Jaber-e Ansar Rural District and Maspi Rural District.

References 

Districts of Ilam Province
Abdanan County